Żaryn' is a Polish surname. Notable people with the surname include:

 (1916-2010), Polish translator, lawyer and social activist, Righteous Among the Nations
Jan Żaryn (born 1958),Polish historian and politician
Stanisław Żaryn (1913–1964), Polish architect, urbanist, historian and academic teacher 

Polish-language surnames